The 1939 Penn Quakers football team was an American football team that represented the University of Pennsylvania as an independent during the 1939 college football season. In its second season under head coach George Munger, the team compiled a 4–4 record and was outscored by a total of 98 to 70. The team played its home games at Franklin Field in Philadelphia.

Schedule

References

Penn
Penn Quakers football seasons
Penn Quakers football